Caballeronia is a genus of bacteria from the family of Burkholderiaceae which has been reported to perform biological nitrogen fixation and promote plant growth

Species
Caballeronia comprises the following species:

 Caballeronia arationis
 Caballeronia arvi
 Candidatus Caballeronia brachyanthoides
 Caballeronia calidae
 Candidatus Caballeronia calva
 Caballeronia catudaia
 Caballeronia choica
 Caballeronia concitans
 Caballeronia cordobensis
 Candidatus Caballeronia crenata
 Caballeronia fortuita
 Caballeronia glathei
 Caballeronia glebae
 Caballeronia grimmiae
 Candidatus Caballeronia hispidae
 Caballeronia humi
 Candidatus Caballeronia humilis
 Caballeronia hypogeia
 Caballeronia jiangsuensis
 Candidatus Caballeronia kirkii
Candidatus Caballeronia mamillata
 Caballeronia megalochromosomata
 Caballeronia mineralivorans
Candidatus Caballeronia nigropunctata
 Caballeronia pedi
 Caballeronia peredens
 Caballeronia ptereochthonis
Candidatus Caballeronia rigidae
Candidatus Caballeronia schumannianae
 Caballeronia sordidicola
 Caballeronia telluris
 Caballeronia temeraria
 Caballeronia terrestris
 Caballeronia turbans
 Caballeronia udeis
Candidatus Caballeronia verschuerenii
Candidatus Caballeronia virens
 Caballeronia zhejiangensis

References 

 

Burkholderiaceae
Bacteria genera